is the professional name of , a Japanese actress, gravure idol, and writer. She has played multiple lead roles in television and film, including Naoko in the 2013 erotic thriller Amai Muchi, for which she received a Newcomer of the Year award at the 37th Japan Academy Prize ceremony.

Early life and education
Mitsu Dan was born on December 3, 1980, in Akita Prefecture, Japan. After graduating from Showa Women's University, she earned a teaching certificate, worked in a funeral parlor, tried but failed to start a sweets shop, and worked as a hostess in a Ginza club before becoming a gravure idol in 2010.

Career 
Dan became known for her role in the BDSM-themed erotic thriller movie Be My Slave (2012), a performance that Giovanni Fazio of The Japan Times summarized as "a starlet is born." The next year she played a lead role in the 2013 erotic thriller , which was directed by Takashi Ishii. At the 37th Japan Academy Prize ceremony Dan was recognized as a Newcomer of the Year for her performance in Amai Muchi.

Over the next few years Dan appeared in numerous television dramas, variety programs, movies, and advertising campaigns, including the kaiju parody , the 90th NHK asadora Hanako to Anne, a 2015 recruiting commercial for the Japan Self-Defense Forces, the 2016 Hulu Japan drama Crow's Blood, and the 2017 film Sekigahara. In 2018 Dan became a weekly host of the radio program Makoto Ōtake Golden Radio! The next year she appeared in the 99th NHK asadora Manpuku.

In July 2017 Dan starred in an official tourism promotion video for Miyagi Prefecture that was created using 2011 Tōhoku earthquake and tsunami reconstruction funds and published online. Female members of the Miyagi Prefectural Assembly, along with members of the public, claimed that the video was sexually suggestive and demanded that it be taken down. Miyagi governor Yoshihiro Murai initially defended the video on the grounds that it successfully brought attention to the prefecture, but after receiving hundreds of complaints in a month he ordered the video withdrawn. Later that year the Japanese Ministry of the Environment appointed Mitsu Dan as a public ambassador to promote home energy conservation.

She made her fiction debut in 2016 with a story in the Bungeishunjū literary magazine . Since April 2017 she has written a monthly advice column for Otokemachi, an online publication of Yomiuri Shimbun. In March 2018 her story  was published in the literary magazine Bungakukai.

Personal life 
Dan married manga artist  in November 2019.

Recognition 
 2014: 37th Japan Academy Prize for Newcomer of the Year

Works 
 , Shōgakukan, 2013, 
 , Daiwashobō, 2013, 
 , Magajinhausu, 2016, 
 , Shinchosha, 2017,

Filmography

Films 
 Be My Slave, 2012
 Amai Muchi, 2013
 Taishibōkei Tanita Shain Shokudō, 2013
 Figure na Anata, 2013
 Hello, My Dolly Girlfriend,
 Chikyū Bōei Mibōjin, 2014
 Sanbun no Ichi, 2014
 Sekigahara, 2017
 Hoshimeguri no Machi, 2018
 Eating Women, 2018
 Mashin Sentai Kiramager the Movie, 2021
 A Dog Named Palma, 2021
 Bad City, 2023

Television 
 Tokumei Tantei, TV Asahi, 2012
 Otenki Oneesan, TV Asahi, 2013
 Hanzawa Naoki, TBS, 2013
 Hanako to Anne, NHK, 2014
 Coffee-ya no Hitobito, NHK, 2014
 Black President, Fuji TV, 2014
 Ore no Dandyism, TV Tokyo, 2014
 Arasa-chan Mushūsei, TV Tokyo, 2014
 Crow's Blood, Hulu Japan, 2016
 Manpuku, NHK, 2019
 Mikazuki, NHK, 2019

References

External links 

 
 

1980 births
Japanese actresses
Japanese gravure models
Japanese female adult models
Japanese television personalities
21st-century Japanese women writers
Actors from Akita Prefecture
Living people
Showa Women's University alumni